Michael Aloysius Feighan (February 16, 1905 – March 19, 1992) was an American politician from Lakewood, Ohio, near Cleveland.  He served as a member of the Ohio House of Representatives, and as a Democratic Party U.S. Representative from 1943 to 1971, serving Ohio's 20th congressional district.

Originally, he was recruited by national Democrats who wanted to replace Congressman Martin L. Sweeney (D-OH), who had for eleven years held the seat representing the west side of Cleveland. They considered Sweeney to be too isolationist; for example, he had argued against enacting Lend-Lease to the United Kingdom.

After Feighan had served almost three decades in the House of Representatives, some local Democratic officials, led by Cleveland City Council President James V. Stanton, had grown tired of his leadership. Sensing that they could not beat Feighan in one election, they set up a stalking horse running a Michael A. Sweeney, a local lawyer with a good political name.  Sweeney lost, but his vote total showed that Feighan could be vulnerable in a rematch. Four years later, in 1970, Stanton himself ran and defeated Feighan in the Democratic primary, concluding Feighan's political career.

During the legislation of the Immigration and Nationality Act of 1965 Feighan insisted that "family unification" should take priority in immigration policy over "employability", on the premise that such a weighting would maintain the existing ethnic profile of the country. That change instead resulted in chain migration dominating the subsequent patterns of immigration to the United States and consequently a more ethnically diverse population.

Electoral history

See also

References

External links

Michael Feighan Papers at the Seeley G. Mudd Manuscript Library, Princeton University
 The Political Graveyard profile

1905 births
1992 deaths
Democratic Party members of the Ohio House of Representatives
Princeton University alumni
Harvard Law School alumni
Politicians from Cleveland
People from Lakewood, Ohio
Democratic Party members of the United States House of Representatives from Ohio
20th-century American politicians